Arkville is a hamlet in the Town of Middletown, Delaware County, New York, United States. It is located along New York State Route 28, one  mile north of the village of Margaretville in the western Catskill Mountains. It has the ZIP code 12406.

Arkville is built either on or very close to the site of an old Lenape village called Pakatagkan.

The main office of the Catskill Center for Conservation and Development is located in the Erpf House along Route 28. The hamlet straddles the Catskill Park Blue Line, which moves from the former Ulster and Delaware Railroad tracks to Dry Brook and then the East Branch of the Delaware River a short distance to the west.

Climate
This climatic region is typified by large seasonal temperature differences, with warm to hot (and often humid) summers and cold (sometimes severely cold) winters.  According to the Köppen Climate Classification system, Arkville has a humid continental climate, abbreviated "Dfb" on climate maps.

References

Hamlets in New York (state)
Catskills
Hamlets in Delaware County, New York